End-systolic volume (ESV) is the volume of blood in a ventricle at the end of contraction, or systole, and the beginning of filling, or diastole.

ESV is the lowest volume of blood in the ventricle at any point in the cardiac cycle.
The main factors that affect the end-systolic volume are afterload and the contractility of the heart.


Uses
End systolic volume can be used clinically as a measurement of the adequacy of cardiac emptying, related to systolic function. On an electrocardiogram, or ECG, the end-systolic volume will be seen at the end of the T wave. Clinically, ESV can be measured using two-dimensional echocardiography, MRI (magnetic resonance tomography) or cardiac CT (computed tomography) or SPECT (single photon emission computed tomography).

Sample values
Along with end-diastolic volume, ESV determines the stroke volume, or output of blood by the heart during a single phase of the cardiac cycle. The stroke volume is the difference between the end-diastolic volume and the end-systolic volume. The end-systolic values in the table below are for the left ventricle:

The right ventricular end-systolic volume (RVESV) normally ranges between 50 and 100 mL.

References

Cardiovascular physiology